Pamela Jean Kruse (born June 3, 1950) is an American former competition swimmer, Olympic medalist, and former world record-holder in two events.

Kruse represented the United States as an 18-year-old at the 1968 Summer Olympics in Mexico City, where she competed in two freestyle events.  She received a silver medal for her second-place performance in the women's 800-meter freestyle (9:35.7), finishing behind American teammate Debbie Meyer (9:24.0).  She also swam in the women's 400-meter freestyle and placed fourth in the event final, and recorded a time of 4:37.2.

After the Olympics, Kruse attended Michigan State University with fellow Olympian Linda Gustavson, where the two swimmers joined Kappa Alpha Theta sorority together.  She swam for the Michigan State Spartans swimming and diving team in Big Ten Conference competition, and she won conference championships in the 100- and 200-yard freestyle, and the 400-yard freestyle relay in 1971.  She graduated from Michigan State with her bachelor's degree in 1973, master's in 1975, and Ph.D. in 1979.

See also
 List of Michigan State University people
 List of Olympic medalists in swimming (women)
 World record progression 200 metres freestyle
 World record progression 400 metres freestyle

References

External links
 

1950 births
Living people
American female freestyle swimmers
World record setters in swimming
Michigan State Spartans women's swimmers
Olympic silver medalists for the United States in swimming
Kruse, Pam
Sportspeople from Miami
Swimmers at the 1967 Pan American Games
Swimmers at the 1968 Summer Olympics
Medalists at the 1968 Summer Olympics
Pan American Games gold medalists for the United States
Pan American Games medalists in swimming
Medalists at the 1967 Pan American Games